Purushottama Lal (28 August 1929 – 3 November 2010), commonly known as P. Lal, was an Indian poet, essayist, translator, professor and publisher. He was the founder of publishing firm Writers Workshop in Calcutta, established in 1958.

Life and education
Born in Kapurthala in the state of Punjab, Lal studied English at St Xavier's College, Calcutta, and later at the University of Calcutta. He would later teach at St. Xavier's College for over forty years. A friend of Fr Robert Antoine, he aspired to be a Jesuit when young, and that haunted his entire oeuvre and life.

P. Lal was Special Professor of Indian Studies at Hofstra University from 1962 to 1963, and held Visiting Professorships at many colleges and universities throughout America. These included University of Illinois, Albion College, Ohio University, Hartwick College, Berea College, and Western Maryland College.

He married Shyamasree Devi in 1955, and had a son, Ananda Lal, and a daughter, Srimati Lal.

Career
He wrote eight books of poetry, over a dozen volumes of literary criticism, a memoir, several books of stories for children, as well as dozens of translations from other languages, chiefly Sanskrit, into English. He also edited a number of literary anthologies. He was awarded the prestigious Jawaharlal Nehru Fellowship in 1969.

He is perhaps best known as the translator and "transcreator" of the epic poem Mahabharata in English. His translation, which was published in an edition of over 300 fascicules since the early 1970s, was republished in a collated edition of 18 large volumes. His Mahabharata is the most complete in any language, comprising all the slokas. His translation is characteristically both poetic and swift to read, and oriented to the oral/musical tradition in which the work was originally created. To emphasise this tradition, he began reading the entire 100,000-sloka work aloud in 1999, for one hour each Sunday at a Calcutta library hall.

In addition to the Mahabharata, his translations from Sanskrit included a number of other religious and literary works, including 21 of the Upanisads, as well as plays and lyric poetry. He also translated modern writers such as Premchand (from the Hindi) and Tagore (from the Bengali).

Since his founding of Writers Workshop, he published over 3000 volumes by Indian literary authors, mostly in English, including poetry, fiction, educational texts, screenplays, drama, "serious comics," and children's books, as well as audiobooks. Writers Workshop has published first books by many authors including Vikram Seth, Pritish Nandy and Chitra Banerjee Divakaruni.

His publishing enterprise was unusual in that he personally served as publisher, editor, reader, secretary, and editorial assistant. The books were also unique in appearance, hand-typeset on local Indian presses and bound in hand-loomed sari cloth. Writers Workshop continues to publish, under the direction of Lal's family members.

Some of the last works he was engaged in publishing were Holmes of the Raj by Vithal Rajan, Seahorse in the Sky  by G Kameshwar and Labyrinth by Arunabha Sengupta.

The Mahabharata Transcreated Translation
This is the most complete translation to date and is still in progress. Harivamsa Parva and Anushasana Parva are still left to be "transcreated" and translated. The Anushasana Parva is expected to be published in early 2023. There are no plans for the Harivamsa Parva at present. The Mairavanacaritam is a part of Ramayana rather than the Mahabharata.

See also

Indian English Poetry
Indian English Literature
Writers Workshop

References

 Writers from Kolkata

External links
A Daughter Remembers: P. Lal and Writers Workshop, by Srimati Lal, CONFLUENCE, UK :
 http://www.confluence.org.uk/a-daughter-remembers-plal-and-writers-workshop/
 https://web.archive.org/web/20160304025136/http://fullcirclebooks.in/node/59492  / FLOWERS FOR MY FATHER, by Srimati Lal, pub. 2011 
 https://web.archive.org/web/20130115160322/http://harmonyindia.org/hportal/VirtualPageView.jsp?page_id=19310
 Kanchangupta.blogspot.com/2010/11/pro-p-lal-in-memoriam.html Prof P Lal, in memoriam by Kanchan Gupta
 Writer's Workshop
 Writer's Workshop New Releases
Harmony Magazine on P. Lal
 50 Years of Writer's Workshop
 A True Pioneer in The Hindu

English-language poets from India
Writers from Punjab, India
Bengali writers
Indian male essayists
Indian literary critics
Academic staff of St. Xavier's College, Kolkata
Indian magazine editors
University of Calcutta alumni
Recipients of the Padma Shri in literature & education
Academic staff of the University of Calcutta
Ohio University faculty
Albion College faculty
Berea College faculty
1929 births
2010 deaths
St. Xavier's College, Kolkata alumni
Indian publishers (people)
20th-century Indian translators
Sanskrit–English translators
20th-century Indian poets
Indian male poets
20th-century Indian essayists
Jawaharlal Nehru Fellows
Hartwick College faculty